Restaurant Stakeout is a scripted American reality television series on the Food Network. The series debuted on March 12, 2012, with the second season premiering on August 29, 2012. It is one of the first non-studio shows attempted on Food Network.

Plot
The series follows William Jack "Willie" Degel, the owner of New York City restaurant Uncle Jack's Steakhouse, who goes behind the scenes of various restaurants across the country at the request of their owner(s). He takes the keys and installs hidden cameras to examine their service problems.

Willie and the owner(s) observe the restaurant's operation from a control room, and Willie comments about what he sees. Once Willie has assembled a list of key issues, the owner(s) calls a staff meeting. Willie appears at the meeting and confronts the staff with his findings. After that takes place, Willie returns the next day to help correct the problems. Some time later, Willie returns (now dressed in casual clothes) to get a status report.

The show differs from other similar shows in that its primary focus is on identifying ways to provide better customer service. Unlike Kitchen Nightmares and Restaurant: Impossible, there is rarely a problem with the cuisine, restaurant cleanliness, menu, or decor. The owner's main fault is being much too easy on the staff. Mystery Diners is also scripted, but usually about determining who is actively undermining the restaurant and getting them fired (although occasionally, a few employees have been fired on this show).

Episodes

Season 1 (2012)

Season 2 (2012)

Season 3 (2013)

Season 4 (2013–14)

Season 5 (2014)

References

External links
 
 

2010s American reality television series
2012 American television series debuts
Food Network original programming